Gradski Stadion Luke is a multi-purpose stadium in Mrkonjić Grad, Bosnia and Herzegovina. It is currently used mostly for football matches and is the home ground of FK Sloboda Mrkonjić Grad of the Second League of the Republika Srpska. The stadium holds 2,000 spectators.

References

Football venues in Bosnia and Herzegovina
Multi-purpose stadiums in Bosnia and Herzegovina
Buildings and structures in Republika Srpska
FK Sloboda Mrkonjić Grad